Haplogroup K2a (M2308, Z4842) is a human Y-chromosome DNA haplogroup. K2a is a primary subclade of haplogroup K2 (M526), which in turn is a primary descendant of haplogroup K (M9). Its sole primary descendant is haplogroup K-M2313 (M2313, Z4858 S11799).

As of 2020, K-M2313 is known to have two primary subclades: Haplogroup NO1 (a.k.a. NO-M214), which has numerous members and the extremely rare K-Y28299, sometimes known as NO2.

Basal, undivergent K2a* (K-M2308*) has been found only in the remains of two Upper Paleolithic individuals, known as "Ust'-Ishim man and "Oase-1", who lived in Siberia and the Banat region of south-central Europe, respectively, about 37–45 ky BP. No examples of K-M2313* or NO1* (NO-M214*) have been identified in living males or remains. However, subclades of  NO1 include a majority of living males in East Asia, Northern Eurasia and South East Asia. K-Y28299 has been found in three living individuals from India. Another two other living males, who have been documented as belonging to K-M2313(xM214), have not been tested for Y28299 (and therefore may belong to K-Y28299). These K-M2313(xM214) individuals have ethnic ties to South Asia and South East Asia respectively: a Telugu from India and an ethnic Malay from Singapore.

Origin 
According to geneticist Spencer Wells, haplogroup K probably originated in the Middle East or Central Asia, possibly in the vicinity of Iran or Pakistan. However, Karafet et al. (2014) proposed that "rapid diversification ... of K-M526", also known as K2, likely occurred in Southeast Asia and later expanded to mainland Asia, although they could not rule out that it might have arisen in Eurasia and later went extinct there, and that either of these scenarios are "equally parsimonius".

Discoveries since 2016 
Before 2016, many authorities considered that the SNP M2308 was always found in conjunction with SNPs such as M2313 and M214.  However, researchers such as G. David Poznik discovered examples of Y-DNA that had some, but not all, of the SNPs peculiar to NO (M214), but also lacked SNPs identifying other primary subclades of K2 (M526). Poznik et al. 2016 therefore identified K2a (M2308), K-M2313 and NO (M214) as "parent", "child" and "grandchild" clades respectively. (While Poznik used the name "K2a1" for K-M2313, this has not been widely adopted – possibly because K2a1 has sometimes been used as an alternate name for other, less closely related haplogroups.) Poznik et al. also found that K-Y28301 – which has living members in India – is descended from K-M2313. The above findings by Poznik et al. were reiterated by the work of Moreno-Mayar et al. in 2018.

As of 2018, authorities like the International Society of Genetic Genealogy (ISOGG) and YFull (Y-Chromosome Sequence Interpretation Service) have not integrated the discoveries of Poznik et al., and differ from each other in nomenclature.
 ISOGG has continued to use the names "K2a" and "NO" in reference to an undifferentiated clade combining K2a (M2308) and K-M2313 (i.e. Poznik's K2a and "K2a1"), while referring to NO-M214 as "NO1".
 YFull does not distinguish between K-M2308 (K2a) and K-M2313, referring to both as "K-M2335".

There is evidence of at least two additional primary branches within K-M2308 (Poznik: K2a) and/or K-M2313 (Poznik: K2a1). 
 YFull alone lists a clade, known only as K-Y28299, branching from an undifferentiated K-M2308/K-M2313 (YFull name: K-M2335). In addition, a newer, more divergent subclade named K-Y28301 is a primary branch of K-Y28299, according to YFull. Furthermore, according to both Poznik and Moreno-Mayar, K-Y28301 is also descended from K-M2313, suggesting the following lineage: K-M2313 > K-Y28299 > K-Y28301. Three living individuals in India have been found to carry K-Y28299* or K-Y28301. (As of 2018, ISOGG had not incorporated K-Y28299 or K-Y28301.)
 ISOGG alone lists a haplogroup known only as "NO1~"  identified by the SNP CTS707/M2306, as a sibling of NO-M214. (Under the taxonomic conventions used by ISOGG, a tilde [~] indicates a distinct haplogroup, the position of which in the phylogeny is as yet unclear.)  NO1~ is likely a primary branch of either K-M2313 or NO-M214, because, as of 2018, YFull regards CTS707/M2306 as synonymous with M214/PAGE39/PAGES00039, and yet NO1~ is also not (according to ISOGG) ancestral to either Haplogroup N (M231) or Haplogroup O (M175).

Phylogenetic tree

K2a K-M2308 
 K-M2313 (Z4952/M2339/E482, F549/M2335/S22380/V4208, CTS11667, Z4842/M2308/V1371, F650/M2346,Z4858/M2313/S11799/E295/E205, Z4829)
 K-Y28299  (Y28299/Y28355, Y28357, Y28412, etc.)
 K-Y28301  (Y28301/Y28328, Y28358, Y28410) 
 NO   (M214/Page39, F176/M2314, CTS5858/M2325/F346, CTS11572)
 N (M231, CTS2947/M2175, Z4891, CTS10118) 
 O (M175/P186/P191/P196, F369/M1755, F380/M1757/S27659) 
         ? "NO1~" (CTS707/M2306) 

Notes regarding phylogenetic tree

Distribution

K2a* (K-M2308*)
K2a* has been found only in the paleolithic remains mentioned above:
 "Ust'-Ishim man" – the name given to 45,000-year-old remains of one of the early modern humans to inhabit western Siberia. The fossil was named after the Ust'-Ishim District of Siberia where it had been discovered. Until 2016, Ust'-Ishim man was classified as belonging to Haplogroup K2*.
 "Oase-1", the remains of an individual who lived approximately 37,800 years ago, in Eastern Europe (modern Romania).

K-M2313
As of 2016, two living males had been found to carry K-M2313(xNO-M214) – a British Asian who identifies as Telugu and an ethnic Malay sampled in Singapore. Note that they were NOT tested for Y28299.

NO (M214)

Basal examples of haplogroup NO* have not been identified.

Subclades of haplogroup NO include a majority of living males in East Asia, South East Asia and northern Eurasia.

K-Y28299*
K-Y28299(xY28301) has been found in a living male from India.

K-Y28301, a subclade of K-Y28299, has been found in living individuals with their origins in Andhra Pradesh and Arunachal Pradesh India.

See also
Human Y-chromosome DNA haplogroup
Genealogical DNA test
Y-chromosome haplogroups in populations of the world

Footnotes

External links 

K2a